Abdulrahman Akkari (born 3 March 1984) is a Syrian footballer who plays as a striker for Al-Safa in Lebanon.

He began his career with Syrian Premier League club Al-Karamah, scoring his first competitive goal in a 2–1 win at Al-Qardaha on 25 May 2004. The following season, he scored a hat-trick in a 5–1 win at Al-Shorta on 21 May 2005. He won the Syrian Premier League championship with Al-Karamah in May 2006, having finished as runner-up in the previous two seasons.  Akkari scored a hat-trick in the match that secured the title for his team, a 4–1 win against Al-Jehad. Later that year, he helped the club reach the final of the AFC Champions League for the first time. Al-Karamah were defeated 3–2 on aggregate in the final by Jeonbuk Hyundai Motors of the K-League. Akkari was dropped for the first leg of the final before coming on as a late substitute in the second leg.

References

External links
 Abdulrahman Akkari at Eurosport
 Abdulrahman Akkari at Kooora

1984 births
Living people
Syrian footballers
Al-Karamah players
Tishreen SC players
Al-Wahda
Syrian expatriate footballers
Expatriate footballers in Jordan
Expatriate footballers in Lebanon
Syrian expatriate sportspeople in Lebanon
Syrian expatriate sportspeople in Jordan
Association football forwards
Sportspeople from Homs
AC Tripoli players
Lebanese Premier League players
Syrian Premier League players